Sune Lindqvist (20 March 1887 – 23 March 1976) was a Swedish archaeologist and scholar. He worked at the Swedish History Museum, where he was responsible for the finds from the boat graves at Valsgärde, and later at Uppsala University, where he wrote two major works alongside several hundred other publications.

Early life and education
Sune Lindqvist was born on 20 March 1887 in Eskilstuna, Sweden, to Carl Axel Lindqvist and Eva Mathilda Hermannia Brambeck. He was fatherless from an early age, and was raised with three older siblings by his mother. He studied Nordic languages, geology and mineralogy under Knut Stjerna and Oscar Almgren.

Career
Lindqvist worked at the Swedish History Museum for eighteen years, starting as an artist and researcher. He later became a departmental head, and was responsible for the study of material found in the boat graves at Valsgärde, including their restoration. In 1927 he became a professor of Scandinavian and Comparative Archaeology at Uppsala University, taking over a position vacated by Oscar Almgren two years previously.  Almgren was the first person to have held the post, having taken it in 1913, but increasing blindness in his 50s required him to give it up. Lindqvist would in turn teach Almgren's son Bertil Almgren, one of Lindqvist's many students, and in 1965 Bertil Almgren would take over the position.

Personal life
Lindqvist died three days past his birthday, on 23 March 1976.

Publications
In addition to two major works, Uppsala högar och Ottarshögen and Gotlands Bildsteine, Lindqvist published more than 200 articles, notes, and reviews between 1909 and 1971.

References

Bibliography
  
  

Swedish archaeologists
1887 births
1976 deaths
20th-century archaeologists
Members of the Royal Gustavus Adolphus Academy
Members of the Royal Society of Sciences in Uppsala